Zuazo may refer to:

People

Alonso de Zuazo (1466–1539), Spanish lawyer and colonial judge, that was governor in New Spain and in Santo Domingo
Hernán Siles Zuazo (1914–1996), Bolivian politician
Koldo Zuazo (born 1956), Basque linguist
Secundino Zuazo (1887–1971), Spanish architect and city planner

Others

Batería de Zuazo, battery located in San Fernando in the Province of Cádiz, Andalusia, Spain
Puente Zuazo, bridge located in San Fernando in the Province of Cádiz, Andalusia, Spain

See also
Suazo (disambiguation)

Disambiguation pages with surname-holder lists